Government Institute of Medical Sciences is a medical college in Kasna, Greater Noida, India.

History
The Government Institute of Medical Sciences (GIMS) Greater Noida, Gautam Buddha Nagar (UP) foundation, was laid on 13 May 2008 by Honble Chief Minister of Uttar Pradesh, Kumari Mayawati ji and hospital was named as Manyawar Kashiram Multi- Specialty Hospital. 
The state assembly passed the bill on 4 December 2012 and proposed to rename the institution as Medical University and Allied Hospital. The building was then constructed as per the university norms. 
On 2 April 2013, Honble Chief Minister of Uttar Pradesh, Shri Akhilesh Yadav inaugurated the hospital from Lucknow to commence the Out-Patient department. 
For efficient functioning of the Out-Patient department, initially a team of 17 doctors were sent on deputation from the state medical services followed by 10 additional doctors holding specializations to upscale the team of the hospital.
Emergency services commenced from 15 August 2014 after which patients started coming to the Emergency Department. Records of in-patient registration were meticulously maintained by the department. 
On 15 February 2016, the institution was renamed as the Government Institute of Medical Sciences (GIMS), registered with Society as an autonomous institution on the lines of SGPGI Lucknow. Thereafter, appointment of teaching faculties and other employees were enrolled as per bye laws.
In 2019, it got approval of Medical Council of India in 2019 to start MBBS course with an intake of 100 students.

First and Second tier health Structure in Gautam Buddha Nagar
DCH Noida, Sector- 30 Noida - Managed by State Health Department. 
ESI Hospital, Sector- 24 Noida- Managed by Central Government. 
CHC Bhangel- Managed by State Health Department. 
CHC Dadri- Managed by State Health Department. 
CHC Badalpur- Managed by State Health Department. 
PHC Bisrakh- Managed by State Health Department. 
Urban Health Post, Hosiyarpur- Managed by NRHM.

Various Departments of the institution 
 Department of Medicine            
 Department of Surgery               
 Department of Orthopedics      
 Department of Gynecology and Obstetrics 
 Department of Otorhinolaryngology, Head & Neck Surgery                                                     
 Department of Ophthalmology       
 Department of Paediatrics             
 Department of Pathology               
 Department of Microbiology         
 Department of Biochemistry     
 Department of Physiotherapy   
 Department of Anesthesia             
 Department of Dermatology      
 Department of Psychiatry           
 Department of Respiratory Medicine
 Department of Emergency Medicine 
 Department of Dental surgery 
 Department of Community Medicine 
 Department of Anatomy       
 Department of Physiology

References

Medical colleges in Uttar Pradesh
Universities and colleges in Noida